Grasholmen is an island in Stavanger municipality in Rogaland county, Norway.  It is located in the Buøy neighborhood in the borough Hundvåg in the city of Stavanger, just north of the city centre. The island is connected to mainland Stavanger via the Stavanger City Bridge and it is connected to the neighboring island of Sølyst by a short bridge.

Grasholmen was historically a part of the municipality of Hetland, but on 1 January 1867 it was transferred to the city of Stavanger.

See also
List of islands of Norway

References

Islands of Stavanger